Orin Greenhill "Mount" Helvey (November 6, 1903 – March 3, 1969) was a college football player and reverend.

Sewanee

"Mount" Helvey was a prominent guard and fullback for the Sewanee Tigers football teams from 1923 to 1926. Helvey also played basketball and ran track.

1926
He was selected All-Southern in 1926. That year, he "attracted considerable attention for his fine defensive play during the season". Arguably the finest example was holding champion Alabama to a 2–0 score largely by his efforts. Helvey was awarded the Porter Cup as Sewanee's best all-around athlete in 1927.

References

External links

Players of American football from Oklahoma
All-Southern college football players
American football guards
American football fullbacks
Sewanee Tigers football players
1903 births
1969 deaths
People from Wynnewood, Oklahoma